277 (two hundred [and] seventy-seven) is the natural number following 276 and preceding 278.

Mathematical properties
277 is the 59th prime number, and is a regular prime.
It is the smallest prime p such that the sum of the inverses of the primes up to p is greater than two.
Since 59 is itself prime, 277 is a super-prime. 59 is also a super-prime (it is the 17th prime), as is 17 (the 7th prime). However, 7 is the fourth prime number, and 4 is not prime. Thus, 277 is a super-super-super-prime but not a super-super-super-super-prime. It is the largest prime factor of the Euclid number 510511 = 2 × 3 × 5 × 7 × 11 × 13 × 17 + 1.

As a member of the lazy caterer's sequence, 277 counts the maximum number of pieces obtained by slicing a pancake with 23 straight cuts.
277 is also a Perrin number, and as such counts the number of maximal independent sets in an icosagon. There are 277 ways to tile a 3 × 8 rectangle with integer-sided squares, and 277 degree-7 monic polynomials with integer coefficients and all roots in the unit disk.
On an infinite chessboard, there are 277 squares that a knight can reach from a given starting position in exactly six moves.

277 appears as the numerator of the fifth term of the Taylor series for the secant function:

Since no number added to the sum of its digits generates 277, it is a self number. The next prime self number is not reached until 367.

References

Integers

ca:Nombre 270#Nombres del 271 al 279